The velvety free-tailed bat or Pallas's mastiff bat (Molossus molossus), is a bat species in the family Molossidae.

Description
This species is brown in color; however, when seen flying around at dusk, it will appear to be black. The tail of M. molossus is long and extends beyond the tail membrane. Its ears are large and round.

Feeding
M. molossus forages in open areas, above tree canopies, around forest edges, and around streams and ponds. Its diet includes moths, beetles, and flying ants. It is commonly seen at dusk, where it will fly solo, catching insects in the air.

Distribution and habitat
It occurs in the Americas from Argentina north to Cuba and Mexico and also the Florida Keys in the United States. It is very common in the Caribbean.

A M. molossus has been observed being killed by a giant centipede (Scolopendra viridicornis) in the Amazon. The lone bat had been roosting inside a man-made wooden structure in Cristalino State Park before the centipede grabbed it with its legs and injected venom into its neck. This observation is notable due to the rarity of centipede predation on bats.

References

 Stokes Beginner's Guide to Bats by Kim Williams, Rob Mies Donald and Lillian Stokes

Molossus (bat)
Mammals of Colombia
Bats of Central America
Mammals of the Dominican Republic
Mammals of Haiti
Mammals of Puerto Rico